New Jersey's 32nd Legislative District is one of 40 districts that make up the map for the New Jersey Legislature. It encompasses the Bergen County boroughs of Edgewater and Fairview and the Hudson County municipalities of East Newark, Guttenberg, Harrison, Kearny, North Bergen, Secaucus, and West New York.

Demographic information
As of the 2020 United States census, the district had a population of 243,875, of whom 195,978 (80.4%) were of voting age. The racial makeup of the district was 77,997 (32.0%) White, 8,905 (3.7%) African American, 3,808 (1.6%) Native American, 29,614 (12.1%) Asian, 119 (0.0%) Pacific Islander, 75,874 (31.1%) from some other race, and 47,558 (19.5%) from two or more races. Hispanic or Latino of any race were 139,402 (57.2%) of the population.

The district had 131,187 registered voters , of whom 42,160 (32.1%) were registered as unaffiliated, 71,131 (54.2%) were registered as Democrats, 16,002 (12.2%) were registered as Republicans, and 1,894 (1.4%) were registered to other parties.

Political representation
For the 2022–2023 session, the district is represented in the State Senate by Nicholas Sacco (D, North Bergen) and in the General Assembly by Angelica M. Jimenez (D, West New York) and Pedro Mejia (D, Secaucus).

The legislative district overlaps with New Jersey's 8th and 9th congressional districts.

District composition since 1973
When the 40-district map was created in 1973, the 32nd District consisted of most of northern Jersey City and North Bergen. For the 1981 redistricting, again a northern section of Jersey City was included as well as North Bergen, Secaucus, Kearny, East Newark, and Harrison. No major changes occurred in the 1991 redistricting though a narrower portion of Jersey City made up a part of the 32nd District and Fairview and Edgewater were added to the district for the first time. In the 2001 redistricting, Edgewater was removed and the Jersey City portion of the district was relegated to just the northern corner of the city. All of Jersey City was removed in the 2011 redistricting, but Edgewater was re-added and Guttenberg and West New York were added to the district for the first time.

In February 2018, Assemblyman and former Assembly Speaker Vincent Prieto was selected to head the New Jersey Sports and Exposition Authority and subsequently resigned his seat. Democratic committee members in Bergen and Hudson Counties selected Pedro Mejia as his replacement; he was sworn in on April 12.

Election history

Election results

Senate

General Assembly

References

Hudson County, New Jersey
Bergen County, New Jersey
32